Francks is a surname. Notable people with the surname include:

Cree Summer Francks (born 1969), American voice actress and singer
Don Francks (1932–2016), Canadian actor, musician, and singer
Rainbow Sun Francks (born 1979), Canadian actor and songwriter

See also
Franck (disambiguation)
Franks (surname)